The 2021 Asian Youth Para Games, also known as the 4th Asian Youth Para Games is the 4th edition of multi-sport event for Asian athletes with different abilities. This event will be held in Manama, Bahrain.

Venues
Khalifa Sports City, a multi-use stadium in Isa Town.
Isa Sports City, the national indoor sports facility.

The Games

Participating nations

Did Not Enter
15 Nations Did Not Enter:
Afghanistan 
Brunei 
China 
Kazakhstan 
North Korea 
Laos 
Macau 
Mongolia 
Myanmar 
Palestine 
Qatar 
Syria 
East Timor 
Turkmenistan 
Vietnam

Sports
About 750 athletes under 20 years (U12-20) and Wheelchair basketball in U23:

  (113)
  (11)
  (11)
  (2)
 (10)
  (59)
  (18)
  (9)
  (1)

Results

Athletics 

Para Athletics Schedule

Para Athletics Results (incomplete)

Swimming 
140 swimmers from 16 countries.

Para Swimming Schedule

Para Swimming Results

Taekwondo 

Martial Arts Registration Online - 2021 Asian Youth Para Games

Wheelchair Basketball 

No Teams in Girls and 7 Teams in Boys.

Goalball 

3 Teams in Girls and 6 Teams in Boys.

Goalball Results

Medals
The number of medals won by some countries has been announced more than the number, but due to the application of the law minus one and also the lack of quorum of participants in some events and disciplines, a number of medals obtained from the final figure and announced by the organizing committee has been reduced.

No medals: 5 nations (Bangladesh, Kyrgyzstan, Lebanon, Maldives, Oman).

Summary Reports

Reports, Results and Medals:

References

External links
 Asian Paralympic Committee
 

Sports competitions in Bahrain
2021
2021 in Asian sport
2021 in Bahraini sport
Asian Youth Para Games
Asian Youth Para Games
Asian Youth Para Games
2021 Asian Youth Para Games